Inge Lindqvist (born 13 March 1935) is a Swedish ski jumper. He competed in the individual event at the 1960 Winter Olympics.

References

External links
 

1935 births
Living people
Swedish male ski jumpers
Olympic ski jumpers of Sweden
Ski jumpers at the 1960 Winter Olympics
People from Eda Municipality
Sportspeople from Värmland County